Hot Country Songs is a chart that ranks the top-performing country music songs in the United States, published by Billboard magazine.  In 1978, 31 different singles topped the chart, then published under the title Hot Country Singles, in 52 issues of the magazine, based on playlists submitted by country music radio stations and sales reports submitted by stores.

Several number ones of 1978 came from artists associated with the so-called outlaw country subgenre, which had emerged as a more hard-edged alternative to the slick production values seen in country music earlier in the 1970s.  Two of the most prominent exponents of the outlaw style, Waylon Jennings and Willie Nelson, collaborated on the longest-running number one of the year, "Mammas Don't Let Your Babies Grow Up to Be Cowboys", which spent four weeks atop the chart; each also reached number one individually.  Jennings' total of seven weeks spent in the top spot was the most by any artist.  Nelson was one of only two artists to take three different singles to number one during the year, as he also reached number one with his recordings of two pre-World War II songs, "Georgia on My Mind" and "Blue Skies", taken from Stardust, an album on which he covered a range of pop standards.  Kenny Rogers also achieved three number ones, as he topped the listing with "Love or Something Like It", "The Gambler" and "Every Time Two Fools Collide", a collaboration with Dottie West.

Another artist linked to the outlaw movement who topped the chart in 1978 was Johnny Paycheck, who reached number one with "Take This Job and Shove It", which would go on to become his most successful and best-known song.  The song, which topped the chart in Billboards first issue of the year, marked his first and only appearance at the top of the Hot Country chart.  In May and June, two vocal groups which would both go on to be inducted into the Country Music Hall of Fame reached number one for the first time: The Statler Brothers with "Do You Know You Are My Sunshine", and The Oak Ridge Boys with "I'll Be True to You".  Margo Smith had her first number one in February with "Don't Break the Heart That Loves You".  She followed it up with another chart-topper in July with "It Only Hurts for a Little While", but these would prove to be her only number one singles.   In April, Dottie West reached the top of the chart for the first time with her duet with Kenny Rogers.  She would go on to achieve further number ones both in collaboration with Rogers and in her own right.

Chart history

See also
1978 in music
List of artists who reached number one on the U.S. country chart

Notes

References

1978
1978 record charts
Country